The 2009 Milk Cup Tournament  edition was a prestigious association football tournament divided into three categories: Elite, Premier, and Junior for differing age groups. It ran between 27 and 31 July.

The Elite section had six teams in 2009, divided into two groups of three followed by a playoff, whilst the Junior and Premier sections were contested by 24 and 20 teams, respectively. Each team played once on Monday and Tuesday as part of a league, from which the top eight teams qualified for the Milk Cup quarter-finals on Wednesday. The remainder of the teams qualify for other cups that run alongside the Milk Cup, with quarter-finals on the Wednesday, semi-finals on Thursday, and the finals on Friday.

Elite – Under 19s – national sides
Premier – Under 17s – club sides and national sides
Junior – Under 15s – club sides and national sides

Clubs and national teams from anywhere in the world may compete on invitatio

Venues

Anderson Park, Coleraine 
University Coleraine
Rugby Avenue, Coleraine 
Coleraine Showgrounds
Limavady Showgrounds 
Roe Mill, Limavady 
Ballymoney Showgrounds 
Riada Stadium 
Ballymena Showgrounds 
Parker Avenue Portrush 
The Warren, Portstewart 
Mullaghacall
Castlerock 
Broughshane

Elite Section

Participants

Matches

Play-Offs

Final

Premier Section

  Burnley
  Cherry Orchard
  Club Cantolao
  County Antrim
  County Armagh
  County Down
  County Fermanagh
  County Londonderry
  County Tyrone
   Cruz Azul
  Desportivo Brasil
  Porto
  Fenerbahçe
  Manchester United
  Otago United
  Shamrock Rovers
  Sheffield United
  South Coast Bayern
  Trudovye Rezervy
  Watford

Junior Section

 AB 	
 AIK 	
 Chelsea	
 Club Necaxa 	
 Pachuca 	
 County Antrim 	
 County Armagh 	
 County Down 	
 County Fermanagh 	
 County Londonderry     	
 County Tyrone 	
 Donegal Schoolboys	
 Dundalk Schoolboys 	
 Everton	
 Hull City 	
 Maccabi Haifa	
 Maccabi Tel Aviv	
 North Dublin Schoolboys	
 Plymouth Argyle       	
 Queen of the South 	
 Spartak Moscow 	
 Swindon Town 	
 The Football Academy of Jerusalem	
 Watford

External links
http://www.nimilkcup.org
http://www.bbc.co.uk/northernireland/milkcup/

2009 in association football
2009
Milk